The black-striped woodcreeper (Xiphorhynchus lachrymosus) is a species of bird in the Dendrocolaptinae subfamily.

It is found in Colombia, Costa Rica, Ecuador, Nicaragua, and Panama. Its natural habitats are subtropical or tropical moist lowland forests and subtropical or tropical mangrove forests.

References

black-striped woodcreeper
Birds of Nicaragua
Birds of Costa Rica
Birds of Panama
Birds of Colombia
Birds of the Tumbes-Chocó-Magdalena
black-striped woodcreeper
Taxonomy articles created by Polbot